Cathy Cade (born 1942, Hawaii), is an American photographer noted for her work in documentary photography, including photos about lesbian mothering. She has been a feminist and lesbian activist since the early 1970s, having gotten her start as an activist and seen the power of photography in the early 1960s as part of the Southern Civil Rights Movement. She currently lives in Berkeley, Ca. and is working with her archives at The Bancroft Library at the University of California at Berkeley. She is a member of the Bay Area Civil Rights Veterans and has memoir material at the Civil Rights Movement Archive. She is a member of Old Lesbians Organizing for Change.

Early life and education 
While attending college, Cade participated in the Southern civil rights movement. In 1969, Cade received a PhD in Sociology.

Work 
"Cade is a longtime activist in the civil rights, gay liberation, and women's liberation movements, and her photographs are intricately linked to her work for social justice."

In late 2000, she started her business "Cathy Cade: Personal Histories, Photo Organizing and Photography".

Family 
Cathy Cade is a mother of two sons.

Publications 
A Lesbian Photo Album: The Lives of Seven Lesbian Feminists. (Oakland, Ca: Waterwomen Books, 1987).
Woman Controlled Conception by Sarah and Mary Anonymous, drawings by Billie Mericle, copyright 1979 by Womanshare Books. Produced and distributed by UnionWAGE.

Awards and fellowships 
2004—Pat Bond Memorial Old Dyke Award: Honoring Extraordinary Lesbians Over 60

References

External links 
 cathycade.com
 Women Artists of the American West, Lesbian Photography on the West Coast

1942 births
Feminist artists
Lesbian feminists
American LGBT photographers
LGBT people from Hawaii
American women photographers
Living people
Artists from Hawaii
American LGBT rights activists
American civil rights activists
Women civil rights activists
21st-century American LGBT people
21st-century American women
American lesbian artists